The 1958 Soviet Cup was an association football cup competition of the Soviet Union.

Competition schedule

Preliminary stage

Group 1

First round
 [Jul 2] 
 Avangard Nikolayev            0-2  SPARTAK Kherson 
   [Kushnaryov 50, Shiman ?] 
 Energiya Volzhskiy            0-2  DINAMO Kirov 
   [Katkov, Nazarov] 
 ISKRA Kazan                   3-1  Krylya Sovetov Voronezh 
   [Surkov, Ignatov, Berezin – Chernyshov] 
 TORPEDO Taganrog              3-1  SKVO Odessa 
   [Vladimir Kutushov 16, V.Nechayev 43, Y.Shikunov ? – V.Moskalenko ?] 
 ZENIT Izhevsk                 4-1  Lokomotiv Saratov 
   [Aleksyutin-2, Yanbukhshin-2 - ?] 
 [Jul 3] 
 ZVEZDA Kirovograd             4-0  Torpedo Gorkiy 
   [B.Petrov-2, Viktor Tretyakov, V.Filin] 
 [Jul 4] 
 Traktor Stalingrad            2-3  DINAMO Ulyanovsk 
   [A.Ionov-2 – Abramov-2, M.Medvedev] 
 Trudoviye Rezervy Lipetsk     1-1  Trudoviye Rezervy Leningrad  
   [Bulkin – Aksyonov]

First round replays
 [Jul 5] 
 Trudoviye Rezervy Lipetsk     1-3  TRUDOVIYE REZERVY Leningrad   
   [Fateyev – Kolobov-2, Tagi-zade]

Quarterfinals
 [Jul 6] 
 DINAMO Kirov                  3-1  Iskra Kazan 
   [Kuzmin, Biryukov, Ilyin – Markov] 
 Spartak Kherson               0-2  ZVEZDA Kirovograd 
   [Filin, Petrov] 
 [Jul 8] 
 TORPEDO Taganrog              4-1  Trudoviye Rezervy Leningrad   [in Lipetsk] 
   [Levchenko-2, Shikunov, Varnakov (TR) og – Aksyonov] 
 ZENIT Izhevsk                 6-3  Dinamo Ulyanovsk 
   [Yanbukhshin-3, Aleksyutin, Mokiyenko, Gubernskiy – Mishin, Abramov, M.Medvedev]

Semifinals
 [Jul 13] 
 TORPEDO Taganrog              2-0  Zvezda Kirovograd 
   [Nechayev-2] 
 ZENIT Izhevsk                 1-0  Dinamo Kirov 
   [Arutyunyan]

Final
 [Jul 22] 
 TORPEDO Taganrog              2-1  Zenit Izhevsk 
   [Levchenko, Saikadze – Gordeyev]

Group 2

First round
 [Jul 1] 
 METALLURG Zaporozhye          2-0  Avangard Simferopol 
   [Terentyev, Lengevich]  
 ZNAMYA TRUDA Orekhovo-Zuyevo  1-0  Khimik Yaroslavl 
   [Petrov] 
 [Jul 2] 
 Avangard Kharkov              2-3  SKCF Sevastopol 
   [Nesterov, Ilyin – Vasilyev-2, Smirnov] 
 KOLHOSPNIK Poltava            8-1  RostSelMash Rostov-na-Donu 
   [Kazankin-2, O.Shchupakov-2, Pelcharskiy-2, Pazho, Brenyo – Matveyev] 
 RAKETA Gorkiy                 3-1  Textilshchik Ivanovo 
   [Knyazev, Lesnukhin, Perekatov (T) og – Rubilov] 
 TRUDOVIYE REZERVY Lugansk     6-2  Trudoviye Rezervy Kursk 
   [Gureyev-2, Pelishko-2, Glukharyov, Belkov – Kiriyenko, Kovtunenko] 
 [Jul 4] 
 Khimik Dneprodzerzhinsk       1-2  KOLHOSPNIK Cherkassy 
   [Shiklo – Mitin-2 pen] 
 METALLURG Dnepropetrovsk      2-1  Trud Stalinogorsk 
   [Y.Balykin, Y.Prokhorov – Y.Orlov]

Quarterfinals
 [Jul 6] 
 ZNAMYA TRUDA Orekhovo-Zuyevo  3-0  SKCF Sevastopol 
   [Loginov-2, Kotychenko] 
 [Jul 8] 
 KOLHOSPNIK Cherkassy          2-1  Raketa Gorkiy 
   [B.Sokolov, M.Vulfovich – Sysalov] 
 [Jul 9] 
 Kolhospnik Poltava            1-1  Metallurg Dnepropetrovsk 
   [O.Shchupakov – V.Lapshin] 
 METALLURG Zaporozhye          3-2  Trudoviye Rezervy Lugansk 
   [Kovalenko-2, Sverdlov – Belkov, Timoshchenko]

Quarterfinals replays
 [Jul 10] 
 Kolhospnik Poltava            1-3  METALLURG Dnepropetrovsk    [aet] 
   [O.Shchupakov ? – M.Didevich 86, V.Lapshin 107, 119]

Semifinals
 [Jul 14] 
 METALLURG Dnepropetrovsk      1-0  Kolhospnik Cherkassy        [aet] 
   [V.Lapshin] 
 ZNAMYA TRUDA Orekhovo-Zuyevo  4-1  Metallurg Zaporozhye 
   [Lampasov-2, Chavkin, Kotychenko – Serebryanikov]

Final
 [Jul 20] 
 ZNAMYA TRUDA Orekhovo-Zuyevo  2-0  Metallurg Dnepropetrovsk 
   [S.Loginov, A.Lampasov]

Group 3

First round
 [Jun 9] 
 DAUGAVA Riga                  3-1  Spartak Uzhgorod 
   [Ulmanis-2, Nikiforov – S.Sabo] 
 [Jun 30] 
 SPARTAK Vilnius               1-0  Spartak Minsk 
   [J.Maculis] 
 [Jul 2] 
 CHERNOMORETS Odessa           2-1  Urozhai Minsk 
   [M.Tserekov, V.Shchegolkov pen – V.Korotkevich] 
 KOLHOSPNIK Rovno              2-1  LTI Leningrad 
   [Y.Ivanov, Shmorgun – Alyukhin]  
 SKVO Lvov                     5-2  Volga Kalinin 
   [Kopayev-2, Breyev pen, Churikov, Filyayev – Velkin-2] 
 SPARTAK Stanislav             w/o  Dinamo Tallinn 
 TRUD Glukhovo                 2-1  Baltika Kaliningrad 
 [Jul 5] 
 LOKOMOTIV Vinnitsa            3-1  SKVO Kiev 
   [Anatoliy Aleksandrov, Mikhail Petrov, Anatoliy Konovalov – Putevskoi]

Quarterfinals
 [Jul 6] 
 KOLHOSPNIK Rovno              2-1  Chernomorets Odessa 
   [M.Tyagai 37, K.Marichev 39 – V.Solovyov ?] 
 [Jul 9] 
 LOKOMOTIV Vinnitsa            2-1  Trud Glukhovo 
   [?, Troyanovskiy – Shishkov] 
 SKVO Lvov                     5-3  Spartak Stanislav           [aet] 
   [Kessler-2, Galbmillion, Kopayev, Filyayev – Y.Dumanskiy, Y.Golovei, Chepiga] 
 [Jul 11] 
 DAUGAVA Riga                  w/o  Spartak Vilnius

Semifinals
 [Jul 15] 
 LOKOMOTIV Vinnitsa            4-2  Daugava Riga 
   [Konovalov-2, Soiko, Troyanovskiy – Ulmanis, Smirnov] 
 SKVO Lvov                     4-0  Kolhospnik Rovno 
   [Breyev pen, O.Morozov, Kessler, Filyayev]

Final
 [Jul 20] 
 Lokomotiv Vinnitsa            0-1  SKVO Lvov 
   [Shishayev]

Group 4

First round
 [Jun 29] 
 LOKOMOTIV Artyomovsk          2-1  Shakhtyor Shakhty 
   [Zinchenko, Kalinin – Bykov (L) og] 
 [Jul 2] 
 LOKOMOTIV Kutaisi             1-0  Metallurg Stalingrad 
   [Sordia] 
 [Jul 6] 
 Shakhtyor Kadiyevka           1-2  SKVO Rostov-na-Donu 
   [Samsonov – Volchenkov, Mosalyov] 
 Shirak Leninakan              0-1  BUREVESTNIK Tbilisi 
   [Mumladze] 
 TEMP Makhachkala              1-0  Spartak Yerevan 
   [Abdullayev] 
 [Jul 8] 
 SKVO Tbilisi                  5-3  Spartak Stavropol 
   [Goreshnev-3, Mikadze, Norakidze – Rybakov, Knyazev, Belyayev] 
 [Jul 10] 
 Neftyanik Baku                1-2  KUBAN Krasnodar             [aet] 
   [Javakhyan – Mangasarov, Zibrov] 
 Trud Astrakhan                0-2  TEREK Grozny  
   [Kachanov, Pismenny]

Quarterfinals
 [Jul 7] 
 LOKOMOTIV Kutaisi             2-1  Lokomotiv Artyomovsk  
   [Kokhiani, Sordia – Ziroyan] 
 [Jul 13] 
 SKVO Rostov-na-Donu           2-1  Temp Makhachkala 
   [Streshniy, Gushchin – Dubovitskiy] 
 [Jul 14] 
 BUREVESTNIK Tbilisi           2-1  Kuban Krasnodar 
   [Sichinava, Urtkmelidze – Samsonov] 
 TEREK Grozny                  4-3  SKVO Tbilisi 
   [Danilov-2, Pismenny, Abramov – Miroshnikov, Norakidze, Kvlividze]

Semifinals
 [Jul 18] 
 SKVO Rostov-na-Donu           2-0  Burevestnik Tbilisi 
   [Yegorov, Volchenkov] 
 TEREK Grozny                  2-0  Lokomotiv Kutaisi 
   [Kh.Danilov, Serednyakov]

Final
 [Jul 22] 
 SKVO Rostov-na-Donu           3-0  Terek Grozny 
   [Telenkov, Yegorov, Shvets]

Group 5

First round
 [Jul 7] 
 METALLURG Magnitogorsk        3-1  Metallurg Nizhniy Tagil 
   [Slyunchenko, Melkonyan, Shchetinin – Balakirev] 
 [Jul 22] 
 Khimik Berezniki              2-6  SKVO Sverdlovsk 
   [Klimov, Gordeyev – Vozzhayev-4, Snegiryov, Potaskuyev] 
 LOKOMOTIV Chelyabinsk         3-1  Devon Ufa 
   [Nechayev, Mikhin, Frolov – Zapakhalov] 
 PAHTAKOR Tashkent             3-0  Hosilot Stalinabad 
   [Krasnitskiy-2, Sheffer] 
 Pamir Leninabad               0-1  KOLHOZCHI Ashkhabad 
   [Polyakov] 
 SHAKHTYOR Karaganda           2-0  Trudoviye Rezervy Tashkent 
   [V.Kamyshev, V.Ledovskikh] 
 SPARTAK Frunze                2-1  Kayrat Alma-Ata 
   [Churikov-2 – Ostroushko] 
 [Jul 23] 
 Zvezda Perm                   1-2  MASHINOSTROITEL Sverdlovsk 
   [B.Petrov 39 – A.Zaitsevskiy 60, S.Gavrilov 77]

Quarterfinals
 [Jul 26] 
 Lokomotiv Chelyabinsk         2-2  SKVO Sverdlovsk 
   [Mikhin, Kozhukhov – Skulkin, Brovkin]  
 [Jul 27] 
 Metallurg Magnitogorsk        0-2  MASHINOSTROITEL Sverdlovsk 
   [A.Zaitsevskiy, Y.Lundin]  
 PAHTAKOR Tashkent             3-0  Kolhozchi Ashkhabad 
   [Borkin, Tazetdinov, Motorin] 
 SPARTAK Frunze                2-1  Shakhtyor Karaganda 
   [Musayev, Poyarkov – Chuvakov]

Quarterfinals replays
 [Jul 27] 
 Lokomotiv Chelyabinsk         3-5  SKVO Sverdlovsk             [aet] 
   [Tufatullin, Mikhin, Smirnov – Neverov-2, Potaskuyev, Gladkikh, Snegiryov]

Semifinals
 [Aug 2] 
 MASHINOSTROITEL Sverdlovsk    2-0  SKVO Sverdlovsk 
   [S.Gavrilov-2] 
 [Aug 6] 
 Spartak Frunze                0-1  PAHTAKOR Tashkent 
   [Varennik]

Final
 [Aug 20] 
 PAHTAKOR Tashkent             2-2  Mashinostroitel Sverdlovsk 
   [Maksudov, Motorin – Y.Brovkin, Y.Lundin] 
 NB: Abandoned at 86’, when Mashinostroitel had 7 players left. 
     Awarded to Pahtakor.

Group 6

First round
 [Jul 2] 
 Luch Vladivostok              w/o  LOKOMOTIV Komsomolsk-na-Amure  
 NB: Originally 2-0 [Benedikt-2], but the result was annulled and 
     the match awarded to Lokomotiv. 
 [Jul 6] 
 ENERGIYA Irkutsk              2-1  SKVO Chita 
   [Kulakov, Zubkov – Titov] 
 Khimik Kemerovo               1-2  TOMICH Tomsk                [aet] 
   [Mokhov (T) og – Tarakanov, A.Chentsov] 
 SibSelMash Novosibirsk        2-4  LOKOMOTIV Krasnoyarsk 
   [Kovshov-2 – Parchenko-2, Gorshkov-2] 
 SKVO Khabarovsk               2-0  Lokomotiv Svobodny 
   [I.Grek, V.Borodin] 
 UROZHAI Barnaul               w/o  Lokomotiv Ulan-Ude

Quarterfinals
 [Jul 10] 
 Irtysh Omsk                   1-1  Lokomotiv Krasnoyarsk 
   [Kostyakov – Parchenko] 
 Lokomotiv Komsomolsk-na-Amure 0-1  SKVO Khabarovsk  
   [I.Grek 87]  
 Tomich Tomsk                  0-1  ENERGIYA Irkutsk  
   [Kirov]  
 UROZHAI Barnaul               6-1  Metallurg Stalinsk 
   [Fedulov-3, Krushnyakov-2, Reshitko - ?]

Quarterfinals replays
 [Jul 11] 
 Irtysh Omsk                   1-2  LOKOMOTIV Krasnoyarsk 
   [M.Kostyakov – Gorshkov-2]

Semifinals
 [Jul 15] 
 ENERGIYA Irkutsk              2-1  Urozhai Barnaul             [aet] 
   [Galeto, Zubkov – Krushnyakov] 
 LOKOMOTIV Krasnoyarsk         3-1  SKVO Khabarovsk 
   [Gorshkov-2, Parchenko – A.Frolov]

Final
 [Jul 20] 
 LOKOMOTIV Krasnoyarsk         4-2  Energiya Irkutsk 
   [Khromenkov-2, Gorshkov, Nikishin – Sadovy, Zubkov]

Group Winners’ Play-off
 [Jul 30] 
 ZNAMYA TRUDA Orekhovo-Zuyevo  1-0  Torpedo Taganrog            [aet] 
   [Sharashkin] 
 [Aug 16] 
 SKVO Lvov                     4-3  SKVO Rostov-na-Donu         [aet] 
   [Kopayev-2, Kurchavenkov, O.Morozov – Volchenkov, Streshniy, Mosalyov]

Final stage

First round
 [Aug 25] 
 LOKOMOTIV Krasnoyarsk         3-0  Zenit Leningrad 
   [V.Lesnyak 7, V.Nikishin 63, A.Parchenko 73] 
 [Oct 2] 
 PAHTAKOR Tashkent             2-1  SKVO Lvov 
   [Vlasov, Motorin – O.Morozov] 
 [Oct 5] 
 ZNAMYA TRUDA Orekhovo-Zuyevo  2-1  Moldova Kishinev 
   [Lampasov, Korolkov – Mikhail Mukhortov] 
 [Oct 6] 
 Dinamo Kiev                   0-4  SPARTAK Moskva 
   [Anatoliy M.Ilyin 17, Anatoliy Isayev 32, Nikita Simonyan 34, Igor Netto 85] 
 [Oct 7] 
 ADMIRALTEYETS Leningrad       3-1  Dinamo Tbilisi 
   [Yuriy Varlamov-2, Yuriy Morozov – Vladimir Barkaia] 
 DINAMO Moskva                 2-1  CSK MO Moskva 
   [Genrikh Fedosov 54, 57 – Ivan Duda 56] 
 Shakhtyor Stalino             1-2  TORPEDO Moskva 
   [Ivan Fedosov 27 – Slava Metreveli 53, Gennadiy Gusarov 66] 
 [Oct 8] 
 Krylya Sovetov Kuibyshev      0-2  LOKOMOTIV Moskva 
   [Viktor Voroshilov 81, Viktor Sokolov 85]

Quarterfinals
 [Oct 10] 
 SPARTAK Moskva                4-1  Lokomotiv Krasnoyarsk 
   [Y.Svishchov (L) 10 og, Sergei Salnikov 22 pen, 58, A.Steblitskiy (L) 42 og – A.Parchenko 50] 
 [Oct 11] 
 Admiralteyets Leningrad       1-6  TORPEDO Moskva 
   [Yuriy Varlamov 4 – Yuriy Falin 5, ?, Gennadiy Gusarov 59, ?, ?, Valentin Ivanov ?] 
 LOKOMOTIV Moskva              2-1  Znamya Truda Orekhovo-Zuyevo 
   [Viktor Orekhov 14, Igor Zaitsev 29 – Korolkov 77] 
 Pahtakor Tashkent             0-2  DINAMO Moskva 
   [Viktor Tsaryov 16, Alexandr Sokolov 55]

Semifinals
 [Oct 10] 
 SPARTAK Moskva                2-1  Dinamo Moskva                 
   [Anatoliy M.Ilyin 16, Anatoliy Isayev 64 – Valeriy Urin 83] 
 [Oct 27] 
 TORPEDO Moskva                2-1  Lokomotiv Moskva            [aet] 
   [Yuriy Falin ?, Slava Metreveli 118 – Zaur Kaloyev 16]

Final

External links
 Complete calendar. helmsoccer.narod.ru
 1958 Soviet Cup. Footballfacts.ru
 1958 Soviet football season. RSSSF

Soviet Cup seasons
Cup
Soviet Cup
Soviet Cup